The Oakland Athletics' 2003 season ended with the A's finishing 1st in the American League West with a record of 96 wins and 66 losses.

Offseason
December 15, 2002: Felipe López was traded as part of a 4-team trade by the Toronto Blue Jays to the Cincinnati Reds. The Oakland Athletics sent a player to be named later to the Toronto Blue Jays. The Arizona Diamondbacks sent Erubiel Durazo to the Oakland Athletics. The Cincinnati Reds sent Elmer Dessens and cash to the Arizona Diamondbacks. The Oakland Athletics sent Jason Arnold (minors) (December 16, 2002) to the Toronto Blue Jays to complete the trade.
December 16, 2002: Neal Cotts was sent by the Oakland Athletics to the Chicago White Sox to complete an earlier deal made on December 3, 2002. The Oakland Athletics sent players to be named later and Billy Koch to the Chicago White Sox for Keith Foulke, Mark L. Johnson, Joe Valentine, and cash. The Oakland Athletics sent Neal Cotts (December 16, 2002) and Daylon Holt (minors) (December 16, 2002) to the Chicago White Sox to complete the trade.
January 27, 2003: John-Ford Griffin was traded by the Oakland Athletics to the Toronto Blue Jays for a player to be named later. The Toronto Blue Jays sent Jason Perry (minors) (June 23, 2003) to the Oakland Athletics to complete the trade.

Regular season

Season standings

Record vs. opponents

Transactions
June 3, 2003: J.R. Towles was drafted by the Oakland Athletics in the 23rd round of the 2003 amateur draft, but did not sign.
July 30, 2003: Aaron Harang was traded by the Oakland Athletics with Jeff Bruksch (minors) and Joe Valentine to the Cincinnati Reds for Jose Guillen.

Roster

Player stats

Batting

Starters by position 
Note: Pos = Position; G = Games played; AB = At bats; H = Hits; Avg. = Batting average; HR = Home runs; RBI = Runs batted in

Other batters 
Note: G = Games played; AB = At bats; H = Hits; Avg. = Batting average; HR = Home runs; RBI = Runs batted in

Pitching

Starting pitchers 
Note: G = Games pitched; IP = Innings pitched; W = Wins; L = Losses; ERA = Earned run average; SO = Strikeouts

Other pitchers 
Note: G = Games pitched; IP = Innings pitched; W = Wins; L = Losses; ERA = Earned run average; SO = Strikeouts

Relief pitchers 
Note: G = Games pitched; W = Wins; L = Losses; SV = Saves; ERA = Earned run average; SO = Strikeouts

Postseason

2003 ALDS 

Game 1: Oakland 5 – Boston 4.

Game 2: Oakland 5 – Boston 1.

Game 3: Boston 3 – Oakland 1.

Game 4: Boston 5 – Oakland 4.

Game 5: Boston 4 – Oakland 3.

Farm system 

LEAGUE CHAMPIONS: Sacramento

References

2003 Oakland Athletics team page at Baseball Reference
2003 Oakland Athletics team page at www.baseball-almanac.com

Oakland Athletics seasons
American League West champion seasons
Oakland Athletics season
Oakland Athletics Season
Oakland Athletics